Orbis Verlag was a Gütersloh-based publisher. The publishing company was later acquired by Bertelsmann.

References

Bertelsmann subsidiaries